Le Bleu de l'océan (The blue of the ocean) was a 2003 French television mini-series. In five episodes of 100 minutes and directed by Didier Albert, it was originally broadcast on TF1 from 2 July 2003 onwards and then repeated on Gulli in 2011.

Plot
Before dying, Talia's adoptive mother tells her that her birth mother was Ariane Delcourt, who was part of one of the most prominent families in Saint-Jean-de-Luz before her disappearance. Talia thus decides to look into the mysterious past but when she approaches the Delcourts she faces their pettiness, especially in her birth sister Mathilde, who nurses the worst intentions.

Cast

Claire Borotra : Talia Vargas
Alexandra Vandernoot : Mathilde Mallet, née Delcourt
Bernard Verley : Charles Delcourt
Philippe Caroit : Clément Mallet
Bruno Madinier : Paul Delcourt
Mireille Darc : Patricia Delcourt
Natacha Amal : Jeanne
Jean-Michel Tinivelli : Marc Esteban
Louise Monot : Julie Delcourt
Anthony Dupray : Olivier Mallet-Delcourt
Églantine Rembauville : Esther Mallet-Delcourt
Jean-Marie Juan : Lieutenant Morel
Philippe du Janerand : Etcheverry
Yves Afonso : Henri Bonnat
Jean-Pascal Lacoste : José Feirrera
Christian Abart : Maurice Hillau
Camille Lafont-Rapnouil : Mathilde as a child

2000s French television miniseries
2000s French television series
French drama television series
Comedy-drama television series
2003 French television series debuts
2003 French television series endings